Evacanthus is a genus of leafhoppers belonging to the family Cicadellidae.

The genus was first described by Amédée Louis Michel le Peletier, comte de Saint-Fargeau and Jean Guillaume Audinet-Serville in 1828.

The species of this genus are found in Eurasia and Northern America.

Species
Evacanthus acuminatus
Evacanthus albicostatus
Evacanthus albipennis
Evacanthus albomaculatus
Evacanthus albovittatus
Evacanthus asiaticus
Evacanthus bellaustralis
Evacanthus bellus
Evacanthus biguttatus
Evacanthus bistigmanus
Evacanthus bivittatus
Evacanthus breviceps
Evacanthus chlamidatus
Evacanthus convolutus
Evacanthus danmainus
Evacanthus densus
Evacanthus digitatus
Evacanthus distinctus
Evacanthus extrema
Evacanthus fanjinganus
Evacanthus fatuus
Evacanthus flavocostatus
Evacanthus flavonervosus
Evacanthus fuscous
Evacanthus grandipes
Evacanthus hairus
Evacanthus heimianus
Evacanthus interruptus
Evacanthus kuohi
Evacanthus lacunar
Evacanthus laminatus
Evacanthus latus
Evacanthus longianus
Evacanthus longispinosus
Evacanthus longus
Evacanthus manaliensis
Evacanthus manpingensis
Evacanthus militaris
Evacanthus nigramericanus
Evacanthus nigrescens
Evacanthus nigrifasciatus
Evacanthus nigriscutus
Evacanthus ochraceus
Evacanthus ogumae
Evacanthus papuensis
Evacanthus procerus
Evacanthus qiansus
Evacanthus repexus
Evacanthus rostagnoi
Evacanthus rubrivenosus
Evacanthus rubroniger
Evacanthus rufescens
Evacanthus ruficostatus
Evacanthus rufomarginatus
Evacanthus spinosus
Evacanthus stigmatus
Evacanthus taeniatus
Evacanthus trimaculatus
Evacanthus uncinatus
Evacanthus ustanuchus
Evacanthus wui
Evacanthus yeshwanthi
Evacanthus yinae

References

Cicadellidae
Cicadellidae genera
Taxa named by Amédée Louis Michel le Peletier
Taxa named by Jean Guillaume Audinet-Serville